Aguaclara Airport  is an airport in Aguaclara, Colombia.

References

Airports in Colombia